Cam Ellsworth is a Canadian ice hockey coach and former player who was the NCAA Division III coach of the year in 2020.

Career
After a very successful junior career with the Soo Indians, Ellsworth joined the program at Michigan Tech. He arrived during the team's dark age when the Huskies were routinely finishing near the bottom of the conference standings. As a result, his four years as a starter ended with an abysmal record of 27–72–10. He did, however, set program records for both games played (117) and saves (3,510). Even with the poor results, Ellsworth performed well enough in goal to embark on a professional career after graduating with a degree in business administration. Over the course of three years, Ellsworth played for four teams in the ECHL, producing decent results at times. He retired as a player in 2008.

Following his playing career, Ellsworth moved behind the bench as an assistant coach for the Sioux City Musketeers. He worked with the club for three seasons before returning to the college ranks. During his 7-year stint with Massachusetts–Lowell, Ellsworth helped the team reach the Frozen Four for the first time in program history while also receiving an MBA.

Upon the retirement of long-time Norwich head coach, Mike McShane in 2018, Ellsworth was named as the successor. In his first year behind the bench, Ellsworth led the team to the national championship game, falling to an undefeated Wisconsin–Stevens Point team. The next year, the Cadets' starter, Tom Aubrun, produced one of the most stunning performances by allowing 21 goals in 27 games and setting several NCAA records including 13 shutouts. Norwich was the #2 team entering the NCAA Tournament and a heavy favorite with Aubrun not having allowed a goal in over 9 games. Unfortunately, the COVID-19 pandemic prevented the team from getting a shot at the national title. Despite the cancellation of the tournament, Ellsworth was named as the national coach of the year.

Statistics

Regular season and playoffs

Head coaching record

Awards and honors

References

External links

1980 births
Canadian ice hockey coaches
Canadian ice hockey players
Living people
Ice hockey people from Ontario
People from Leamington, Ontario
Soo Indians players
Michigan Tech Huskies men's ice hockey players
Augusta Lynx players
Greenville Grrrowl players
Stockton Thunder players
Pensacola Ice Pilots players
Norwich University faculty